Clostridium argentinense is an anaerobic, motile, gram-positive bacterium. Some bacilli now identified as Cl. argentinense were previously classified as either Cl. subterminale, Cl. hastiforme, or Cl. botulinum toxin group G, respectively.

Like Cl. botulinum, Cl. argentinense produces botulin, a neurotoxin that causes botulism in susceptible mammals. Among this proteolytic species' products are acetic acid, butyric acid, isobutyric acid, isovaleric acid, and hydrogen sulfide. Cl. argentinense is also asaccharolytic  (i.e., unable to metabolize carbohydrates).

References

External links
 
 

Gram-positive bacteria
Medically important anaerobes
Bacteria described in 1988
argentinense